Lerona is an unincorporated community in Mercer County, West Virginia, United States. Lerona has a post office with ZIP code 25971.

References

Unincorporated communities in Mercer County, West Virginia
Unincorporated communities in West Virginia